Going Back To The Blue Ridge Mountains is a live album by the progressive bluegrass band Country Gentlemen. It includes songs performed live by the "almost classic" lineup of the group (without Tom Gray, with Ed Ferris on bass). The recordings come from live performances during early and mid 60's.

Track listing

 Going Back to the Blue Ridge Mountains 2:00
 Going to the Races 2:09
 Azzuro Campana 2:41
 Dark as a Dungeon 5:05
 Copper Kettle 3:01
 Billy in the Low Ground 2:19
 I Saw the Light 2:09
 Tom Dooley #2 2:55
 Brown Mountain Light 2:43
 Electricity 2:30
 Daybreak in Dixie 2:22
 Mary Dear 3:52
 Sad and Lonesome Day 2:40
 Cripple Creek 2:49
 Don't This Road Look Rough and Rocky 3:16
 Muleskinner Blues 3:58

Personnel
 Charlie Waller - guitar, vocals
 John Duffey - mandolin, vocals
 Eddie Adcock - banjo, vocals
 Ed Ferris - bass, vocals

References

The Country Gentlemen albums
1973 live albums
Folkways Records live albums